The Pepperdine Graziadio Business School (Graziadio School) is the graduate business school of Pepperdine University, a private research university affiliated with the Churches of Christ with its main campus in Los Angeles County, California. The school offers doctorate, MBA, MS, and executive degree programs. It is one of the largest graduate business schools in Southern California with more than 41,000 alumni and is accredited by the Association to Advance Collegiate Schools of Business (AACSB). The business school was established in 1969 and named in honor of George L. Graziadio, Jr. after he donated US$15 million in 1996.

Campuses

The Pepperdine Graziadio Business School is headquartered in West Los Angeles at the Howard Hughes Center next to Interstate 405. The West Los Angeles campus, along with campuses in Encino, Irvine, San Jose, and Calabasas, host the school's part-time programs. Full-time programs are headquartered at the main Pepperdine University campus in Malibu. International programs take place at various international universities each trimester.

Rankings

 Forbes ranked the Graziadio School as #65 in the nation for return on investment in their 2017 "Best Business Schools" survey.
 In its 2017 edition of The Best 294 Business Schools, The Princeton Review ranked the Graziadio School among the nation's top graduate business programs. Pepperdine Graziadio was ranked #7 on the “Most Competitive Students” list and #8 Most Beautiful Campus.
 Bloomberg Businessweek ranked the Graziadio School #84 as one of 2017's Best Business Schools.
 In its 2017 Universities Report, Pitchbook named the MBA program at Pepperdine Graziadio #25 for founders produced, and #18 for female founders.

Graziadio Center for Applied Research

The Center for Applied Research supports the mission of the Pepperdine Graziadio Business School to advance responsible business practice and support knowledge and education that has direct application and relevance for working professionals and their organizations.

Center for Teaching and Learning Excellence

The Center for Teaching and Learning Excellence at the Graziadio School was established with the mission of promoting innovation in business education. The center provides faculty with training and development opportunities, collects data on learning assurances, and conducts research.

Graziadio Business Review 
The Graziadio Business Review is an online peer-reviewed journal of applied business research published by the Graziadio School since 1998.

See also
 List of business schools in the United States
 Pepperdine University

References

External links
Official website

Business schools in California
Pepperdine University
Educational institutions established in 1969
University subdivisions in California
1969 establishments in California